This is a list of electoral divisions and wards in the ceremonial county of Merseyside in North West England. All changes since the re-organisation of local government following the passing of the Local Government Act 1972 are shown. The number of councillors elected for each electoral division or ward is shown in brackets.

District councils

Knowsley
Wards from 1 April 1974 (first election 10 May 1973) to 6 May 1982:

Wards from 6 May 1982 to 10 June 2004:

Wards from 10 June 2004 to 5 May 2016:

Wards from 5 May 2016 to present:

Liverpool
Wards from 1 November 1835 (First election 26 December 1835) to 31 October 1895:

Wards from 1 November 1895 (first election 1 November 1895) to 30 April 1953:

1913 Two new wards created : Much Woolton and Allerton, Childwall and Little Woolton

1920  Allerton, Childwall and Little Woolton ward split into Allerton (1 seat); Childwall (2 seats) and Little Woolton (1 seat)

1924 Second seat added for Allerton ward.

1925 Third seat added for Allerton ward

1928 Third seat added for Childwall ward. Croxteth ward added.

Wards from 1 May 1953 (first election 1 May 1953) to 30 April 1973:

Wards from 1 April 1974 (first election 10 May 1973) to 1 May 1980:

Wards from 1 May 1980 to 10 June 2004:

Wards from 10 June 2004 to present:

Sefton
Wards from 1 April 1974 (first election 10 May 1973) to 3 May 1979:

Wards from 3 May 1979 to 4 May 2000:

Wards from 4 May 2000 to 10 June 2004:

Wards from 10 June 2004 to present:

St Helens
Wards from 1 April 1974 (first election 10 May 1973) to 1 May 1980:

Wards from 1 May 1980 to 10 June 2004:

Wards from 10 June 2004 to 5 May 2022:

Wards from 5 May 2022:

Wirral
Wards from 1 April 1974 (first election 10 May 1973) to 1 May 1980:

Wards from 1 May 1980 to 10 June 2004:

Wards from 10 June 2004 to present:

Former county council

Merseyside
Electoral Divisions from 1 April 1974 (first election 12 April 1973) to 1 April 1986 (county council abolished):

Electoral Divisions due from 2 May 1985 (order revoked by the Local Government Act 1985):

Electoral wards by constituency
The current parliamentary constituency boundaries have been in use since the 2010 United Kingdom general election, and were defined according to electoral wards as they existed in 2007.

Birkenhead
Bidston and St James,  Birkenhead and Tranmere, Claughton, Oxton, Prenton, Rock Ferry.

Bootle
Church, Derby, Ford, Linacre, Litherland, Netherton and Orrell, St Oswald, Victoria.

Garston and Halewood
Allerton and Hunts Cross, Belle Vale, Cressington, Halewood North, Halewood South, Halewood West, Speke-Garston, Woolton.

Knowsley
Cherryfield, Kirkby Central, Longview, Northwood, Page Moss, Park, Prescot West, Roby, St Bartholomews, St Gabriels,
St Michaels, Shevington, Stockbridge, Swanside, Whitefield.

Liverpool, Riverside
Central, Greenbank, Kirkdale, Mossley Hill, Princes Park, Riverside, St Michael's.

Liverpool, Walton
Anfield, Clubmoor, County, Everton, Fazakerley, Warbreck.

Liverpool, Wavertree
Childwall, Church, Kensington and Fairfield, Old Swan, Picton, Wavertree.

Liverpool, West Derby
Croxteth, Knotty Ash, Norris Green, Tuebrook and Stoneycroft, West Derby, Yew Tree.

Sefton Central
Blundellsands, Harington, Manor, Molyneux, Park, Ravenmeols, Sudell.

Southport
Ainsdale, Birkdale, Cambridge, Duke's, Kew, Meols, Norwood.

St Helens North
Billinge and Seneley Green, Blackbrook, Earlestown, Haydock, Moss Bank, Newton, Parr, Rainford, Windle.

St Helens South and Whiston
Bold, Eccleston, Prescot East, Rainhill, Sutton, Thatto Heath, Town Centre, West Park, Whiston North, Whiston South.

Wallasey
Leasowe and Moreton East, Liscard, Moreton West and Saughall Massie, New Brighton, Seacombe, Wallasey.

Wirral South
Bebington, Bromborough, Clatterbridge, Eastham, Heswall.

Wirral West
Greasby, Frankby and Irby, Hoylake and Meols, Pensby and Thingwall, Upton, West Kirby and Thurstaston.

See also
List of parliamentary constituencies in Merseyside

References
http://www.opsi.gov.uk/si/si2007/uksi_20071681_en_1

Merseyside